Martin Wenger House is a historic home located at South Bend, St. Joseph County, Indiana.  It was built in 1851, and is a two-story, Italianate style frame dwelling. It sits on a fieldstone foundation and has a low-pitched hipped roof.  It features a full-width front porch, paired scroll-sawn brackets, and round arched window openings.

It was listed on the National Register of Historic Places in 2000.

References

Houses on the National Register of Historic Places in Indiana
Italianate architecture in Indiana
Houses completed in 1851
Houses in South Bend, Indiana
National Register of Historic Places in St. Joseph County, Indiana